The Shipley School is an independent pre-K12 college preparatory school in Bryn Mawr, Pennsylvania, United States, approximately 10 miles west-northwest of Philadelphia.

History
Hannah Shipley, Elizabeth Shipley, and Katharine Shipley, all sisters, founded The Shipley School in 1888 as a preparatory school for Bryn Mawr College, a women's college located directly across the street. The Shipley sisters were strong-willed, educated Quaker women and created the school to pass on their values to similarly minded young women. The school opened in the Fall of 1894 with six students and nine faculty members.

By the 1940s, Shipley had expanded the student body to 341 students. At this time, about half of all Upper School students were boarders hailing from all over the country and from Europe, Asia, Russia, the Middle East, and Latin America.

During the 1970s and 1980s, Shipley discontinued its boarding department and began to admit male students. The last boarders graduated in 1982, and by 1984 the school was fully coeducational with equal numbers of girls and boys.

Notable alumni
 Gavin Becker, American singer, songwriter and actor
Jessica Knoll, author
Vinton Liddell Pickens, American county planner and artist
Marshmello, American electronic music producer/DJ
 Robb Armstrong, author of Jump Start comic strip
Victoria Legrand, of the dream pop duo Beach House.
Beatrice Wood, artist and studio potter
David Corenswet, American actor, screenwriter, and producer

References

Preparatory schools in Pennsylvania
Private elementary schools in Pennsylvania
Private middle schools in Pennsylvania
Private high schools in Pennsylvania
Educational institutions established in 1894
Lower Merion Township, Pennsylvania
Schools in Montgomery County, Pennsylvania
1894 establishments in Pennsylvania